Mianwala Kariya is a town of Bahawalpur District in the Punjab province of eastern Pakistan. Neighbouring settlements include Najwaniwala and Faqirwali.

References

Populated places in Bahawalpur District